The Flying Fox of Snowy Mountain is a 1978 Hong Kong tele-film adapted from Louis Cha's novels Fox Volant of the Snowy Mountain and The Young Flying Fox. The series was produced by CTV.

Cast
 Note: Some of the characters' names are in Cantonese romanisation.

 Barry Chan as Wu Fei / Wu Yat-do
 Michelle Yim as Yuen Tze-yi
 Wen Hsueh-erh as Ching Ling-so
 Lee Tong-ming as Miu Yeuk-lan
 Jason Pai as Miu Yan-fung
 Law Lok-lam as Tin Kwai-nung
 Lawrence Ng Wai-kwok  as Fuk-hong-on / Chan Ka-lok
 Helen Ma as Mrs Wu
 Chun Wong as Chiu Bun-san
 Cheng Lui as Yim Kei

External links

1978 films
Films based on works by Jin Yong
Hong Kong martial arts films
Works based on Flying Fox of Snowy Mountain
Films set in the Qing dynasty
Wuxia films
1970s Hong Kong films